The al-Baraqua II was a ferry which capsized on April 6, 2006, in the Gulf of Tadjoura off the coast of Djibouti's capital of Djibouti City. The ferry was carrying passengers from the capital to a religious festival in Tadjoura when the accident occurred, shortly after departure. As of April 11, the death toll stood at 113 with many still missing.

Djibouti president Ismail Omar Guelleh ordered an investigation into the sinking. Early reports suggest the ferry may have been overcrowded. About 200 people were believed to be on board the ferry when it capsized.

References

le boutre « Al-Baraka II » coule à Djibouti
http://patfalc.blog.lemonde.fr/2006/04/08/2006_04_le_boutre_albar/

Shipwrecks in the Red Sea
Transport disasters in Djibouti
Maritime incidents in 2006
2006 in Djibouti
Water transport in Djibouti